Church of St. Nicholas in Mirkovci is Serbian Orthodox church in eastern Croatia.

The church was constructed in period between 1804 and 1813. It was reconstructed three times in the 20th century, firstly in 1912 during Austria-Hungary, then in 1975 in Socialist Federal Republic of Yugoslavia, and finally in 1993 during the Croatian War of Independence when Mirkovci were part of self-proclaimed SAO Eastern Slavonia, Baranja and Western Syrmia.

In March 2013 the church's wall was vandalized with engraving of fascist Ustashe symbol. The same incident happened again next month, this time with the inscription in lacquer spray.

See also
Eparchy of Osječko polje and Baranja
Mirkovci
Serbs of Croatia
Church of St. Panteleimon, Mirkovci
List of Serbian Orthodox churches in Croatia

References

Mirkovci
Vinkovci